WVKM (106.7 FM) is a public radio formatted broadcast radio station licensed to Matewan, West Virginia, serving parts of Southern West Virginia, Eastern Kentucky, and Southwest Virginia. WVKM is owned and operated by West Virginia Educational Broadcasting Authority.

Sale
On October 30, 2014, the West Virginia Educational Broadcasting Authority approved the purchase of WVKM from George and Evelyn Warren for $280,000. Once approved, the station would carry programming from West Virginia Public Radio. The sale was consummated effective July 13, 2015, at a final price of $300,000.

References

External links

Radio stations established in 1989
VKM
Mingo County, West Virginia